Clyde Beckles (14 August 1948 – 15 February 2001) was a Barbadian cricketer. He played in four first-class and four List A matches for the Barbados cricket team in 1977/78 and 1978/79.

See also
 List of Barbadian representative cricketers

References

External links
 

1948 births
2001 deaths
Barbadian cricketers
Barbados cricketers
People from Saint Philip, Barbados